This is a list of things named after German mathematician and astronomer  Johannes Kepler (1571 – 1630).

Geometry

Kepler conjecture
Kepler triangle
Kepler–Bouwkamp constant
Kepler–Poinsot polyhedron

Celestial mechanics

Kepler's laws of planetary motion
Kepler's equation
Keplerian elements
Kepler problem
Kepler problem in general relativity

Astronomy

Instruments and spacecraft

Kepler space telescope
Kepler Launch Site
Kepler photometer
Keplerian telescope
Kepler refractor
Johannes Kepler ATV

Astronomical objects

Moons and Asteroids

Kepler (lunar crater)
Kepler (Martian crater)
Kepler Dorsum
1134 Kepler
Kepler orbit

Stars

Kepler Object of Interest
Kepler-11
Kepler-22
Kepler-22b
Kepler's Supernova

Computing

Kepler Follow-up Program
Kepler Input Catalog

Software

Kepler scientific workflow system

Geography and institutions

Kepler Mire
Kepler Museum
Kepler Track
Kepler College
Johannes Kepler University Linz
Kepplerstraße, a street in Frankfurt am Main

Other
Kepler (opera)
Kepler Challenge
Kepler (microarchitecture)
Kep1er, a South Korean K-pop girlgroup 

Kepler, Johannes
Kepler, Johannes
Johannes Kepler